Schistura quasimodo is a species of stone loach (a ray-finned fish) in the genus Schistura. It is known from a single stream from the Nam Ngum drainage in Laos, a tributary of the Mekong. It has a cylindrical body, sometimes with a conspicuous hump (the species epithet refers to Quasimodo, character in Victor Hugo's The Hunchback of Notre-Dame).

S. quasimodo has a very restricted distribution and may be threatened by pollution from mining activities, sedimentation from deforestation, and hydro-power development.

References 

 

Q
Fish of the Mekong Basin
Fish of Laos
Endemic fauna of Laos
Fish described in 2000